Sterling Winfield (born January 14, 1970) is an American music producer. He has worked with Pantera on several albums, including Reinventing the Steel (2000). He also co-produced the post-Pantera band Damageplan's 2004 debut album, New Found Power. In 2007, he worked with Vinnie Paul's new supergroup Hellyeah on their self-titled debut album.

References 

American record producers
1970 births
Living people